Wilhelm Reinhard Berger (9 August 1861 – 16 January 1911) was a German composer, pianist and conductor.

Life
Berger's father, originally a merchant from Bremen, worked in Boston (where Berger was born) as a music shopkeeper and made a name for himself as an author after the family had returned to Bremen in 1862. Early on, his son showed signs of musical interest and aptitude. By the time of his first concert, age fourteen, Wilhelm had already composed a large number of songs and works for the piano. Between 1878 and 1884, Berger studied at the Royal Conservatory in Berlin, under Ernst Rudorff (piano) and Friedrich Kiel (counterpoint). From 1888 to 1903, he was a teacher at the Klindworth-Scharwenka Conservatory, a function which he combined, from 1899, with the chief conductorship of the Berlin Musical Society. In addition, he was very active as a concert pianist. In 1903, Berger was made a member of the German Royal Academy of Arts, and in the same year he was appointed 'Hofkapellmeister' in Meiningen as successor of Fritz Steinbach. In 1911 he died at Jena, aged 49, due to complications after a stomach operation.

Musical style
Like most of the composers from the circle of the 'Berlin Academics', Berger developed a great mastery of music theory. Stylistically, his music is very close to that of Johannes Brahms, even though it almost hints at the later works of Max Reger (who was to become Berger's successor as Meiningen Kapellmeister) through its preference for dissonant harmony and counterpoint techniques.

Berger was a prolific composer - his oeuvre numbers well over a hundred works. The Piano Quintet, Op. 95, the Second Symphony and the late compositions for choir are generally considered to be his masterpieces. Long after his death, his work was rated very highly, particularly among musical conservatives. Wilhelm Altmann wrote very positively about Berger in the third volume of his influential Manual for String Quartet Players (Handbuch für Streichquartettspieler).

Selected works

Choral Music
Sechs Gesänge für gem. Chor op. 25
Es schleicht um Busch und Halde
Im Fliederbusch
Leise rauscht des Lebens Welle
Ständchen
Trost der Nacht
Wie nun alles stirbt und endet
Drei Gesänge for mixed Chorus op. 44
Ach in diesen blauen Tagen
Lenzfahrt
Niss Puk
Vier geistliche Lieder und Gesänge op. 54
Mitten wir im Leben sind
Müde, das Lebensboot weiter zu steuern
Groß ist der Herr
Gebet
Drei Gesänge für 6- und 8-stimmigen Chor op. 103
Karfreitag
Sturmesmythe
Von ferne klingen Glocken
(all recorded 2006, Berlin)

Orchestral
Symphony No. 1 in B flat major op. 71
Symphony No. 2 in B minor (H-moll) op. 80
Variations and Fugue on an original Theme, op. 97
Serenade for Twelve Wind Players, op. 102

Chamber music
Violin Sonata No. 1, op. 7
Piano Quartet in A major, op. 21
Cello Sonata in D minor, op. 28
Violin Sonata No. 2, op. 29
String Trio in G minor, op.69 (1898)
Violin Sonata No. 3 in G minor, op. 70
String Quintet in E minor, op. 75 (1899)
Clarinet Trio in G minor, op. 94 (1903)
Piano Quintet in F minor, op. 95
Piano Quartet in C minor, op. 100

Piano Music
Sonata in B major, op. 76
Four Fugues, op. 89
Variations & Fugue on an original theme, op. 91
RISM online lists 157 (as of August 2016) manuscript/early print entries of works by Wilhelm Reinhard Berger, including an autograph of a different (fragmentary?) piano trio in G minor, a fragmentary cello sonata, a concertpiece for piano and orchestra in E minor, 71 kinderlieder, and other works, many of these in the library of the Max-Reger-Archiv, Meiningen.

Further reading
Biography by Max Unger ("Wilhelm Berger: eine Skizze seines Lebens und Schaffens." 24 November 1910 Neue Zeitschrift für Musik, starting page 369)

References

External links
 
A short biography in German
Wilhelm Berger Clarinet Trio, Op.94, String Quintet Op.75 & Piano Quintet Op.95 Sound-bites and discussion of works
Berger at klassika.info

Quintets, violins, viola, violoncellos, op. 75, E minor (From the Sibley Music Library Digital Scores Collection)
Variationen und Fuge über ein eigenes Thema für Klavier (From the Sibley Music Library Digital Scores Collection)

1861 births
1911 deaths
19th-century classical composers
19th-century classical pianists
19th-century German composers
19th-century conductors (music)
20th-century classical composers
20th-century classical pianists
20th-century German male classical pianists
20th-century German conductors (music)
20th-century German composers
20th-century German male musicians
German classical pianists
German male classical composers
German male classical pianists
German male conductors (music)
German Romantic composers
Musicians from Berlin